The 2011 Bucknell Bison football team represented Bucknell University in the 2011 NCAA Division I FCS football season. The Bison were led by second-year head coach Joe Susan and played their home games at Christy Mathewson–Memorial Stadium. They are a member of the Patriot League. They finished the season 6–5, 3–3 in Patriot League play to finish in fourth place.

Schedule

References

Bucknell
Bucknell Bison football seasons
Bucknell Bison football